Samir Deb Sarkar   was an Indian politician and a member of the Tripura Legislative Assembly from Khowai Assembly constituency.

See Also 
Dasarath Deb
Arun Kumar Kar

References

Communist Party of India (Marxist) politicians from Tripura
Tripura MLAs 1983–1988
Tripura MLAs 1993–1998
Tripura MLAs 1998–2003
Tripura MLAs 2003–2008
Tripura MLAs 2008–2013
2016 deaths